Kumara-devam is a village in East Godavari district of the Indian state of Andhra Pradesh. It is located in Kovvur mandal. Kovvur railway Station and Pasivedala railway Station are the nearest train stations.

Demographics 

 Census of India, Kumaradevan had a population of 4015. The total population constitutes 1911 males and 2104 females with a sex ratio of 1101 females per 1000 males. 363 children are in the age group of 0–6 years, with sex ratio of 1213. The average literacy rate stands at 72.12%.

References

Villages in East Godavari district